Flée may refer to the following communes in France:

 Flée, Côte-d'Or, in the Côte-d'Or department
 Flée, Sarthe, in the Sarthe department
 Dampierre-et-Flée, in the Côte-d'Or department
 L'Hôtellerie-de-Flée, in the Maine-et-Loire department
 La Ferrière-de-Flée, in the Maine-et-Loire department
 Saint-Sauveur-de-Flée, in the Maine-et-Loire department

See also
 Flee (disambiguation)